is a city located in Okayama Prefecture, Japan.

The modern city of Asakuchi was established on March 21, 2006, from the merger of the towns of Kamogata, Konkō and Yorishima (all from Asakuchi District).

As of 2019, the city has an estimated population of 34,263, with 14,236 households and a population density of 530 persons per km².

International relations

Twin towns — Sister cities
Asakuchi is twinned with:

  City of Tea Tree Gully, Australia (2007) 
  Gao'an, China (2009)

References

External links
 Asakuchi City official website 

Cities in Okayama Prefecture